Sanngto Aika is a 2014 Marathi language Indian film. Written by Parag Kulkarni and directed by Satish Rajwade, based on a social issue. The film was released on 2 October 2014 all over Maharashtra. and was the film debut of television star Sanskruti Balgude. The film was produced and presented by Vidhi Kasliwal and Landmarc Films.

Plot
A drunkard stand up comedian finds himself all alone at the crossroads of life when he is entangled by political stooges to take the fall for a crime he has not committed. His loving wife and 6-year-old son feel let down by him, this incites the drunkard to use his presence of mind and sheer wit to try and emerge a hero in their eyes.

Cast

 Sachin Pilgaonkar as Ambatrao Gholap
 Vaibhav Mangle as Constable Palav
 Bhau Kadam as PSI Kharade
 Milind Shinde as Jhunjharrao aka Bhau
 Jagannath Nivangune as Vikramrao aka Nana
 Pooja Sawant as Kshitija
 Sanskruti Balgude as Mohini
 Madhav Abhyankar as Prataprao
 Atul Kaswa as Sarjerao
 Master Shubam Parab as Kisna
 Vijay Chavan as Shastri

Production
Sanngto Aika has brought together for the first time two popular personalities of the Marathi Film industry: actor-film maker Sachin Pilgaonkar and director Satish Rajwade.  The lead cast of this film is headed by Sachin Pilgaonkar, Bhau Kadam, Vaibhav Mangle, Jagannath Nivangune, Milind Shinde, Pooja Sawant, Madhav Abhyankar, Sanskruti Balgude, and Marathi stalwart Vijay Chavan.  Story & screenplay is by Parag Kulkarni, dialogues by Sanjay Pawar, and Suhas Gujrathi is the director of photography. Art direction is by Nikhil Kovale and music by Avinash Vishwajeet.
The film is directed by Satish Rajwade, who has given many back-to-back successful films like Premachi Goshta and Mumbai-Pune-Mumbai among others.  Producer Vidhi Kasliwal has been associated with the Indian film industry for several years and has worked under Sooraj R. Barjatya, as director & producer for Rajshri Productions on several films.  Kasliwal had previously worked as an associate director for the films Vivah, and Ek Vivaah... Aisa Bhi, and has written and directed the youth based film Isi Life Mein in 2010.

Soundtrack

The songs were composed by Avinash-Vishwajeet with lyrics by Guru Thakur, Shrirang Godbole and Damyanti Wagh.

References

External links
 

2014 films
2010s Marathi-language films
Films directed by Satish Rajwade